5 P.M. or variants may refer to:

A time on the 12-hour clock
5 PM (film), a 2017 Iranian comedy film

See also 
 5 o'clock (disambiguation)

Date and time disambiguation pages